Thomas Troward (1847–1916) was an English author whose works influenced the New Thought Movement and mystic Christianity.

Background
Troward was a divisional Judge in Punjab in British-administered India. His avocation was the study of comparative religion.

After his retirement from the judiciary in 1896, Troward set out to apply logic and a judicial weighing of evidence in the study of matters of cause and effect. The philosopher William James characterized Troward’s Edinburgh Lectures on Mental Science as "far and away the ablest statement of philosophy I have met, beautiful in its sustained clearness of thought and style, a really classic statement."

According to Alcoholics Anonymous (AA) archivist Nell Wing, early AA members were strongly encouraged to read Thomas Troward's Edinburgh Lectures on Mental Science. In the opening of the 2006 film The Secret, introductory remarks credit Troward's philosophy with inspiring the movie and its production.

Troward was a past president of the International New Thought Alliance.

Geneviève Behrend studied with Troward from 1912 until 1914; Behrend was the only personal student he had throughout his life.

Bob Proctor credited Troward's works on a number of occasions, and cited The Creative Process in the Individual as the most important in developing the persistence of an individual.

Bibliography

The Edinburgh Lectures on Mental Science 1904
The Dore Lectures on Mental Science 1909
Bible Mystery and Bible Meaning 1913
The Creative Process in the Individual 1915
The Years 1914 to 1923 in Bible Prophecy 1915
The Law and the Word 1917
The Hidden Power and Other Papers on Mental Science 1921

See also 
List of New Thought writers
Geneviève Behrend

References

Further reading
Thomas Troward, the Man & His Work, Harry Gaze

External links 
 
 
 
 Religious Movements History

1847 births
1916 deaths
New Thought writers
New Thought mystics
20th-century English writers
20th-century Christian mystics